Huang Guangliang (born 18 February 1999) is a Chinese footballer currently playing as a midfielder for Guangzhou.

Career statistics

Club
.

References

1999 births
Living people
Chinese footballers
Association football midfielders
Guangzhou F.C. players
Chinese Super League players
21st-century Chinese people